Erny may refer to:

People
 Elizabeth Erny Foote (born 1953), American lawyer
 Ernie Colón
 Erny Brenner (1931–2016), Luxembourgish football player
 Erny Kirchen (born 1949), Luxembourgish cyclist
 Erny Pinckert (1908–1977), American American football player
 Erny Putz (1917–1995), Luxembourgish fencer
 Erny Schweitzer (born 1939), Luxembourgish swimmer

Places
 Erny Field, United States
 Erny-Saint-Julien, France